Y2K: Funkin' Till 2000 Comz is the 15th album by the Gap Band, released in 1999 on Eagle Records. This was the last studio album by the band before they retired in 2010.

Track listing

References

External links
Y2K: Funkin' Till 2000 Comz at Discogs

1999 albums
The Gap Band albums
Eagle Records albums